School 2017 is a South Korean television series starring Kim Jung-hyun, Kim Se-jeong, Jang Dong-yoon, Han Sun-hwa, and Han Joo-wan. It aired on KBS2 from July 17 to September 5, 2017 every Monday and Tuesday at 22:00 (KST) for 23 episodes. The series is the seventh installment of KBS2's School franchise.

Synopsis
The plot follows a class of high school students attempting to overcome the stress of being ranked by their exam grades, and facing the difficulties of being a teenager in a high-pressure, corrupt system. Its central protagonist is Ra Eun-ho (Kim Se-jeong), a cheerful and kind-hearted 18-year-old who dreams of being a webtoon artist but is caught up in the search for a mysterious troublemaker in the school, known as 'Student X'. When she is accused of being Student X, her dream of going to university to study art is put at risk as she faces expulsion. Hyun Tae-woon (Kim Jung-hyun) is the son of the director of the school who enjoys his youth but hides deep scars. Song Dae-hwi (Jang Dong-yoon) is a bright student who's ranked 1st every time but doesn't have enough money for his dream college.

Cast

Main
 Kim Jung-hyun as Hyun Tae-woon / Student X 
 The rebellious son of the school's director. He doesn't take school seriously and resents his father. Secretly, as Student X, he plays pranks on the school without revealing his true identity. He was involved in a motorcycle accident in which his best friend Joon-ki died after saving Eun-ho, who later becomes Tae-woon's love interest.
 Kim Se-jeong as Ra Eun-ho
 An 18-year-old student who is low-ranked but optimistic and dreams of studying to become a webtoon artist. She comes from a working-class family who owns a chicken restaurant.
 Jang Dong-yoon as Song Dae-hwi
 The school's student president. He is a seemingly perfect student who is always ranked first place, despite coming from a poor family. He is in a relationship with Hong Nam-joo, who comes from a poor family but appears wealthy. He was best friends with Tae-woon and Joon-ki before the accident. However, after the death of Joon-ki, he and Tae-woon fell into a conflicted relationship.
 Han Joo-wan as Shim Kang-myung
Form teacher for Class 2-1. Though he struggles to speak up against authority, he cares deeply for his students and always believes in them, despite the backlash he receives from school management. He falls in love with the police officer Han Soo-ji.
 Han Sun-hwa as Han Soo-ji
 A police detective who gets demoted for mishandling a case, and ends up assigned as the school police officer. She is an ace detective and a stickler for rules. She falls in love with teacher Shim Kang-myung.

Supporting

Students
 Seol In-ah as Hong Nam-joo
 Dae-hwi's girlfriend. She pretends to be from a rich family because she is ashamed of her father's actual profession as a taxi driver. She is frustrated and stressed because of her family's financial struggles. 
 Park Se-wan as Oh Sa-rang
 Eun-ho's loyal best friend, who is a big fan of Issue. Her mother is a cleaner at the school and she has given up her dreams to support her mother. She often gets into fights with Eun-ho but always makes it up.
 Seo Ji-hoon as Yoon Kyung-woo
 A guitarist and singer-songwriter who had been educated abroad. He has a crush on Sa-rang. He often comforts her.
 Rowoon as Kang Hyun-il / Issue
 An unpopular member of the K-pop boy group Cherry on Top whose stage name is Issue. A transfer student at Eun-ho's school. He is the guy Oh Sa-rang has a crush on.
 Kim Hee-chan as Kim Hee-chan
 Son of a prominent prosecutor. He is tutored by Dae-hwi but is jealous of him because he always comes in second place to him. When he was in grade 10 he used to date Seo Bo-ra, but ends up splitting because he is obsessive and abusive. He really wants to prove who X is.
 Hong Kyung as Won Byung-goo
 Tae-woon's clueless friend, often seen drinking strawberry milk.
 Han Bo-bae as Seo Bo-ra
 A target of bullying in the class. She is afraid to report Young-gun and her other bullies to teachers because of their previous failings. She used to date Kim Hee-chan in year 10 before she broke up with him for being abusive. She takes a while to trust people, and believes in forgiveness. She is a loyal friend to Eun-ho.
 Ji Hye-ran as Yoo Bit-na
 Highly-strung daughter of a sought-after plastic surgeon. She is one of Bo-ra's bullies. She often blames everything on her and overreacts. She uses her money against everyone.
 Ha Seung-ri as Hwang Young-gun
 A troublemaker who bullies Bo-ra. She later trains to become a police officer, inspired by Han Soo-ji. She is loyal and will owe up to anyone's mistakes. She is struggling to find a place to belong.
 Kim Min-ha as Yeo Sung-eun
 A member of Young-gun's group.
 Song Yoo-jung as Choi Hyun-jung
 A member of Young-gun's group.
 Lee Joon-woo as Go Hak-jung
 Ahn Seung-gyun as Ahn Jung-il
 Choi Sung-min as Han Duk Soo

School personnel
 Lee Jong-won as Hyun Kang-woo
 Rich and powerful director of the school. He is the father of Hyun Tae-woon.
 Kim Eung-soo as Yang Do-jin
 The school's corrupt principal.
 Park Chul-min as Park Myung-deok
 Assistant to the principal, who dreams of being promoted.

Teachers
 Lee Jae-yong as Koo Young-goo, a strict but fair teacher who succeeds Hyun Kang-woo to become Geumdo High School's principal.
  as Jung Joon-soo, a PE teacher who is Shim Kang-myung's rival for police officer Han Soo-ji's affections.
 Jo Mi-ryung as Jang So-ran

Ra family
 Sung Ji-ru as Ra Sun-bong, Eun-ho's father, who secretly works laying pavements to earn money for Eun-ho to go to extracurricular classes.
 Kim Hee-jung as Kim Sa-bun, Eun-ho's mother. She is seen as strict but she is very caring. She manages everything around the house.
  as Ra Tae-shik, Eun-ho's brother. He is seen is irresponsible by his family and doesn't have big dreams. All he wants is to be an employee at a company.

Extended
 Mi Jung as Na Young-ok, Song Dae-hwi's mother.
 Kim Soo-jin as Oh Sa-rang's mother, a cleaner at Geumdo High School.
 Choo Kwi-jung as Kim Hee-chan's mother.
 Kim Jin-woo as Im Joon-ki, Tae-woon and Dae-hwi's late best friend.
 Shin Yun-sook as Im Joon-ki's grandmother.
 Kim Sun-hwa as Ahn Jung-il's mother.
 Lee Jae-kyung as Parent.
 Song Yoo-hyun as College Academic Counselor.
 Lee Hyun-suk
 Ahn Tae-joon
 Kim Song
 Kim Bo-kyung
 Lee Jae-seo
 Kwon Se-rin
 Shin Joo-hang
 Won Jin-ho
 Kim Si-eun as Lee Min-jung	
 Jung Yo-han
 Park Hye-young
 Lee Yoon-ji
 Kim Ji-sung as Ham Yoon-hee
 Choi Moon-kyung
 Yoo Chae-mok
 Lee Se-rang
 Park Ji-yun
 Kim Jae-chul
 Yoo In-soo as Min-joon	
 Jo Jae-hyun
 So Joon-hyung
 Lee Mi-kyung
 Park Ok-chool

Special appearances
 Kang Min-hyuk as Jong-geun (Episode 1), a student at Eun-ho's dream college, whom Eun-ho has a crush on.

Production
In May 2017, KBS offered the leading role to Kim Yoo-jung as a follow-up project to her popular series Love in the Moonlight (2016). By June 2017, she officially declined.
The first script reading of the series took place on June 19, 2017 at the KBS Annex Building in Yeouido, Seoul, South Korea.

Original soundtrack

Part 01

Part 2

Part 3

Part 4

Part 5

Part 6

Ratings
 In this table,  represent the lowest ratings and  represent the highest ratings.
 NR denotes that the drama did not rank in the top 20 daily programs on that date.

Awards and nominations

See also
 School (South Korean TV series)

References

External links
  
 
 

2017 South Korean television series debuts
Korean Broadcasting System television dramas
Korean-language television shows
South Korean high school television series
South Korean teen dramas
2017 South Korean television seasons
2017 South Korean television series endings
Television series about teenagers